The National Games of Pakistan is a multi-sport event held in Pakistan. It comprises various disciplines in which sportsmen from the different teams participate against each other. The games are organized by Pakistan Sports Board, Pakistan Olympic Association and the host province.

History
Before the Independence, in 1924, Indian chapter of the Olympic movement was born. The founder was Hassan, the first Secretary of the Punjab Olympic Association. Lt. Col. H.L.O. Garrett, vice principal of Government College, Lahore, was the President of the founder body. At the same time, the Indian Olympic Games were organised in Delhi, Calcutta, and Lahore, the then capital of undivided Punjab.

The Games were held every two years from 1924 as Indian Olympic Games and were renamed as National Games when they were first held in Bombay in 1940.

Post-independence 
After the independence of Pakistan the first National Games were held at Polo Ground, Karachi from 23 to 25 April 1948. The games were organised by Mr. Ahmed E.H. Jaffar, the first President of Pakistan Olympic Association.

Sportsmen and officials from East Pakistan (now Bangladesh) and all the integrated Provincial units of West Pakistan took part in these Games. The total number of athletes was 140. No competitors were, however, invited from any foreign country. Competitions were held in Track and Field, Basketball, Boxing, Cycling, Volleyball, Weightlifting and Wrestling. 
The overall championship was won by the Punjab contingent.

Quaid-i-Azam Trophy 
Father of the nation and the first Governor General of Pakistan, Muhammad Ali Jinnah declared the 1st National Games open. The Quaid-i-Azam donated a "Challenge Shield" from his private funds. The trophy is now named as the "Quaid-i-Azam Trophy" and is awarded to the winner team on every edition.

Organisation
The National Games are required to be held once in two years leaving those years in which the Olympic Games and Asian Games are scheduled to be held, depending upon situation in country. Only in exceptional cases or natural calamity, the Pakistan Olympic Association (POA) can allow relaxation from the general rule. The duration and the regulation of the National Games is entirely within the jurisdiction of POA.

The games are jointly organised by Pakistan Sports Board, Pakistan Olympic Association and the provincial government of the host city.

Editions

Sports
In 2019, over 12,000 athletes participated in 31 different sports in 33rd edition of National games held in Peshawar, Khyber Pakhtunkhwa.

Archery
Athletics
Badminton
Baseball
Basketball
Bodybuilding
Boxing
Cycling
Football
Golf
Gymnastics

Handball
Field hockey
Judo
Kabaddi
Karate
Rowing
Rugby
Sailing
Shooting
Softball
Squash
*Swimming
Table tennis
Taekwondo
Tennis
Tug of war
Volleyball
Weightlifting
Wrestling
Wushu

See also 
 Quaid-e-Azam Inter Provincial Youth Games

References

External links
 Official website
 Sports webpage at Pakistani Government website

Multi-sport events in Pakistan
Pakistan
Sport in Pakistan
Sports competitions in Pakistan
Recurring sporting events established in 1948
1948 establishments in Pakistan